The constituency of the Creuse is a French legislative constituency for the entire Creuse département.

Constituencies in the Department 

Prior to the 2010 redistricting of French legislative constituencies, the department had two constituencies.

The first constituency consisted of the cantons of Bénévent-l'Abbaye, Bonnat, Bourganeuf, Dun-le-Palestel, Le Grand-Bourg, Guéret Nord, Guéret Sud-Est, Guéret Sud-Ouest, Saint-Vaury, and La Souterraine.

The second constituency consisted of the cantons of Ahun, Aubusson, Auzances, Bellegarde-en-Marche, Boussac, Chambon-sur-Voueize, Châtelus-Malvaleix, Chénérailles, La Courtine, Crocq, Evaux-les-Bains, Felletin, Gentioux-Pigerolles, Jarnages, Pontarion, Royère-de-Vassivière, and Saint-Sulpice-les-Champs.
The second constituency's last deputy was elected at the 2007 election.

Historic representation 

This table shows the historic representation of Creuse's 1st constituency up to the 2012 election, which was the first election with only one constituency for the whole department.

Election results

2022

 
 
 
 
 
 
 
 
|-
| colspan="8" bgcolor="#E9E9E9"|
|-

2017

2012

References

Sources
 Official results of French elections from 1998: 

1